Waller's Last Trip, is a 1989 West German drama film directed by Christian Wagner.

Cast 
 Rolf Illig – Waller (old)
 Volker Prechtel – Karg
 Herbert Knaup – Waller (young)
 Crescentia Dünßer – Angelika Heindl
 Sibylle Canonica – Rosina
 Rainer Egger – Albin
 Irm Hermann – Ordensschwester

References

External links
 

1989 films
1989 drama films
German drama films
West German films
1980s German-language films
1980s German films